Martin Fournier is a Canadian film director from Quebec, most noted as codirector with Pier-Luc Latulippe of the documentary films Manor (Manoir) and Dehors Serge dehors.

Manor won the Prix Iris for Best Documentary Film at the 19th Quebec Cinema Awards in 2017 and was the winner of the 2017 Prix collégial du cinéma québécois, while Dehors Serge dehors was a Prix Iris nominee for Best Documentary Film at the 24th Quebec Cinema Awards in 2022.

Separately from Latulippe, Fournier has also directed the short documentary film Robert Lepage: Tuned to a Different Frequency, Cœur de pirate's music video for "Pour un infidèle", and episodes of the documentary television series La vie nous arrive.

References

External links

Canadian documentary film directors
Canadian music video directors
Canadian television directors
Film directors from Quebec
French Quebecers
Living people
Year of birth missing (living people)